The APNPP, an acronym of "l’association des pays non producteurs de pétrole" (in English: the "Pan-African Non-Petroleum Producers Association"), is an association of 15 African nations that signed a treaty in July 2006.

Their stated aim is to work together to promote biofuel production and reduce the effects of high oil prices.

The APNPP, which was first proposed by Abdoulaye Wade, is being led by the Ministry of Energy and Mines of Senegal. , the acting head is Madické Niang.

Members (and HDI)
 Benin (HDI: 0.525)
 Burkina Faso (HDI: 0.449)
 The Democratic Republic of the Congo (HDI: 0.479)
 Gambia (HDI: 0.500)
 Ghana (HDI: 0.632)
 Guinea (HDI: 0.465)
 Guinea-Bissau (HDI: 0.483)
 Madagascar (HDI: 0.501)
 Mali (HDI: 0.428)
 Morocco (HDI: 0.683)
 Niger (HDI: 0.400)
 Senegal (HDI: 0.511)
 Sierra Leone (HDI: 0.477)
 Togo (HDI: 0.539)
 Zambia (HDI: 0.565)

Sources:

References

External links
 A closer look at Africa's 'Green OPEC', August 2, 2006
 Africa Over A Barrel, The Washington Post, October 28, 2006
 "Biofuels: Strategic Choices for Commodity Dependent Developing Countries", by Sonja Vermeulen and others from the International Institute for Economic Development for the Common Fund for Commodities, November 2007

International energy organizations
International organizations based in Africa
Organizations established in 2006
Intergovernmental organizations established by treaty